James Anthony Dunn KSG (30 January 1926 – 27 April 1985) was a Labour Party politician in the United Kingdom.

Dunn was educated at St. Theresa's School, Liverpool and the London School of Economics and became an engineer. He was a councillor on Liverpool City Council from 1958 until 1965 and served as secretary of Liverpool Co-operative Party. He was a councillor for the ward of Kirkdale, a very working class area that was moving from voting Conservative to voting for the Labour Party.

Dunn was elected Labour Member of Parliament (MP) for Liverpool Kirkdale in 1964. He was a government whip from 1974 to 1976, and junior Northern Ireland minister from 1976 to 1979. From 1964 to 1970 he was a member of the Commons Estimates Committee and a member of the Commons Procedures Committee from 1964 until 1967. 
In 1980, he was convicted of shoplifting a sweatshirt, two ties and two armbands vauled at £15.13 from the Army & Navy Stores in Victoria and a map valued at 60 p from a stationers' shop in Artillery Row  on 27 July 1979. At the time he had taking anti-depressant drugs. He had been followed out of the Army & Navy Stores by two store detectives who then saw him stealing the map. When they caught him he requested a quiet chat, but was turned over to the police. His trial took place on 12 May 1980, and Dunn pled not guilty. Although he admitted taking the goods he used as his defence his state of mind at the time of the incident. Dunn claimed that he had panicked when he saw the store detectives as he thought they were people he had dealt with in Northern Ireland. He was in poor health at the time, having had a heart attack in 1978, and had found his time as a minister, which involved regular trips to and from Northern Ireland, had left him exhausted. Additionally the evening before the offense he had attended a late-night debate in Parliament and consumed five half-pints of beer in the House of Commons bar. After this he had taken a sleeping tablet, but had only had "a fitful night's sleep". He said he was unable to remember exactly his actions the following day. Although he was found guilty, the judge accepted that his "appalling state of health" had caused him to act out of character and gave him a conditional discharge though he had to pay £100 costs.

In 1981, Dunn was among the Labour MPs who defected to the new Social Democratic Party.  In 1983, he left the House of Commons when his seat was abolished by boundary changes. He died at the age of 59 in 1985.

Dunn had four children.

References

Times Guide to the House of Commons, 1966, 1979 and 1983 editions

External links 
 
 

1926 births
1985 deaths
Alumni of the London School of Economics
English politicians convicted of crimes
Labour Party (UK) MPs for English constituencies
Councillors in Liverpool
Social Democratic Party (UK) MPs for English constituencies
UK MPs 1964–1966
UK MPs 1966–1970
UK MPs 1970–1974
UK MPs 1974
UK MPs 1974–1979
UK MPs 1979–1983
Members of the Parliament of the United Kingdom for Liverpool constituencies
Labour Party (UK) councillors
Northern Ireland Office junior ministers